Sean Gallagher (born September 2, 1965) is a British actor, best known for his role of Paul Connor in Coronation Street.

Career

Gallagher appeared in EastEnders from 1992 to 1993 as a playboy called Clive who had an affair with then-married Sam Mitchell.

In 1997 Gallagher played the role of Alan in the BAFTA-winning BBC series "Holding On" by Tony Marchant.

In 2006 he played the part of Chip in the second new series of Doctor Who opposite David Tennant in the episode "New Earth". In 2006, Gallagher signed up to Coronation Street to play the part of Paul Connor, one of two brothers buying a share in Underworld, the local knicker factory. In early 2007, Gallagher resigned from the Manchester-based ITV programme to pursue other roles, eventually leaving Coronation Street in June 2007.

On 2 July 2007, it was announced Gallagher had been cast for the lead role of Mal Faith in a new ITV drama series, Rock Rivals, produced by Shed Productions. He starred alongside former EastEnders actress Michelle Collins who played his wife, Karina Faith.

He appeared in a production of Mary Stuart for the Traverse Theatre, Edinburgh, with David Oakes and Penny Layden.

He performed in The Black Album at the Cottesloe Theatre/National Theatre in London's South Bank in 2009 and then started a national UK tour with the cast throughout the UK in October/November 2009.

He also voiced one of the characters in The Happy Prince, a stop-animation film, produced by Skatedog Films and directed by John Horabin in 2009. This newly released adaptation of the classic Oscar Wilde short story was featured at the BFI in London in autumn 2009.

He also appeared in the ITV dramas Eternal Law and Leaving and BBC drama Our Girl.

In 2017, he appeared in Midsomer Murders "Red in Tooth & Claw" as Errol Judd and in 2019 in Father Brown “The Sacrifice of Tantalus” as Len Blaisen.

Activism
Gallagher is known to support animal welfare societies. In August 2008, Gallagher appeared as a celebrity contestant on an episode of Who Wants to Be a Millionaire, raising funds for World Animal Protection project to end bear dancing in India, "an issue that he feels strongly about."

Filmography

Film

Television

References

External links
 

1965 births
Living people
English male television actors
Male actors from Bedfordshire
People from Luton
Actors from Luton